Mitchell Ian "Mitch" Nichols (born 1 May 1989) is an Australian professional footballer who plays as a midfielder for Gold Coast United FC in the National Premier Leagues Queensland.

Club career

Brisbane Roar
He signed a two-year deal on 11 May 2007 with the Roar after impressing in the opening rounds of the Gold Coast Premier League with Palm Beach Sharks, leading the goal scoring charts from midfield after 7 matches. Roar manager Frank Farina stated that Nichols was "one for the future" the official press conference following his signing.

Nichols made a solid start to his career in the A-League with a number of substitute appearances. He also received his first call-up to the Australian Under 20 squad for a training camp on 7 October 2007. He scored his first goal for the Roar in his side's 4–1 victory over Perth Glory midway through the 2008–09 season. In the 2011–12 season, the midfielder exceeded expectations pre-season, scoring 10 goals, mostly from long range. He also made the A-league Team of the Season, alongside teammates Thomas Broich and Besart Berisha.

Melbourne Victory
Before he joined Melbourne Victory he went on trial at Danish club Randers. On 13 May 2013, it was announced by Melbourne Victory that Nichols had signed a two-year deal with the club, reuniting him with his former Roar manager Ange Postecoglou. He became Postecoglou's first new signing ahead of the 2013/14 Hyundai A-League season.

Cerezo Osaka
Japanese J1 League Club Cerezo Osaka made multiple bids for Nichols during the January 2014 transfer window, the highest of which reaching $400,000. Melbourne Victory stood firm despite Nichols' interest in the offer, however look set to complete the deal in the hope of acquiring young Australian midfielder, Tom Rogic.

In the end following Nichols' interest in moving and Tom Rogic joining Melbourne Victory, Nichols joined Cerezo Osaka. Nichols made his debut for Cerezo on 11 March 2014, coming off the bench in an AFC Champions League match against Shandong Luneng Taishan, which Cerezo lost 1–3.

Loan to Perth Glory
On 23 June 2014, Nichols joined Perth Glory on a one-year loan.

Western Sydney Wanderers
On 3 July 2015, Nichols signed a two-year deal with A-League side Western Sydney Wanderers. Nichols made his Wanderers debut against Brisbane Roar on 8 October 2015, scoring his debut goal for the club in the 13th minute of Wanderers' 3–1 defeat. On 11 May 2017, it was announced that Wanderers would not be renewing Nichols' contract.

Despite Nichols admitting to drug possession, on 13 June 2017, Perth Glory signed him on a two-year deal. On 20 February 2018, Nichols and Perth Glory mutually terminated his contract due to family reasons.

Wellington Phoenix
On 23 July 2018, it was announced that Nichols had signed a two-year deal with Wellington Phoenix to stay in the A-league.

On 15 January 2019, it was announced that Nichols and the Phoenix had parted ways.

Gold Coast Knights
On 15 March 2019, Nichols signed for National Premier Leagues Queensland side Gold Coast Knights.

Olympic FC
On 23rd of June 2022, Nichols signed for National Premier Leagues Queensland side Olympic FC.

Gold Coast United FC
On 9th January 2023, it was announced that Nichols signed for National Premier Leagues Queensland side Gold Coast United FC.

International career
Nichols represented the Australia U-20 team during the AFC U-19 Championship in Saudi Arabia. He scored two goals in the Quarter Final match against North Korea including a spectacular overhead kick in extra time. Nichols represented the Australia U-23 team receiving his first cap in 2010. Nichols made his first senior international debut for the Socceroos on 4 March 2009 in an AFC Asian Cup qualifying match versus Kuwait.

Club statistics

1 – includes A-League final series statistics
2 – includes FIFA Club World Cup statistics; AFC Champions League statistics are included in season commencing after group stages (i.e. ACL and A-League seasons etc.)

Honours

Club
Brisbane Roar:
 A-League Premiership: 2010–2011
 A-League Championship: 2010–2011, 2011–12

Gold Coast Knights
NPL Queensland Championship: 2019

Country
Australia:
 AFF U19 Youth Championship: 2008

Individual
 PFA Team of the Season: 2011–12, 2015–16

References

External links
 

1989 births
Living people
Sportspeople from the Gold Coast, Queensland
Soccer players from Queensland
Australian soccer players
Association football forwards
Brisbane Roar FC players
A-League Men players
Australia under-20 international soccer players
Australia international soccer players
Australian people of Dutch descent
Melbourne Victory FC players
Gold Coast Knights F.C. players
J1 League players
Cerezo Osaka players
Expatriate footballers in Japan
Perth Glory FC players
Western Sydney Wanderers FC players
Wellington Phoenix FC players